The XM806 Lightweight .50 Caliber Machine Gun (LW50MG) was a developmental .50 caliber belt-fed heavy machine gun. Development began in 2009 and was cancelled in 2012.

Design 

The XM806 weighed about  less (49% lighter), had 60% less recoil than the M2, and had a greater rate of fire than the failed previous attempt to replace the M2, the XM312. The XM806 did however have a considerably slower rate of fire than the M2. The XM806 also had improvements to user safety and was easier to disassemble.

The XM806 was spun out from the cancelled XM307 and was developed by General Dynamics to augment the M2. General Dynamics received a $9 million contract for the weapon. It was expected to be deployed starting at the end of fiscal year 2012. Delays caused its planned deployment to be pushed to 2013 or 2014.  The XM806 was cancelled in July 2012, with the Army using the money allocated to upgrade their M2 machine guns to the M2A1 version.

Notes

External links
 XM806 on PEO Soldier
 Farewell Ma Duce! Welcome LW50MG
 Ma Deuce Goes Back To The Drawing Board from Strategy Page
 LW50 on Modern Firearms

.50 BMG machine guns